Phillip Kipyeko (born 1 January 1995) is a Ugandan long-distance runner competing primarily in the 5000 metres. He represented his country at the 2013 and 2015 World Championships in Athletics missing the final on both occasions.

International competitions

Personal bests
Outdoor
1500 metres – 3:45.00 (Kampala 2013)
3000 metres – 7:44.14 (Hengelo 2014)
5000 metres – 13:10.69 (Heusden-Zolder 2015)
10 kilometres – 28:18 (Makutano 2013)

References

1995 births
Living people
Ugandan male long-distance runners
World Athletics Championships athletes for Uganda
Place of birth missing (living people)
Athletes (track and field) at the 2016 Summer Olympics
Athletes (track and field) at the 2018 Commonwealth Games
Olympic athletes of Uganda
Commonwealth Games competitors for Uganda
21st-century Ugandan people